Eupithecia zygadeniata is a species of moth in the family Geometridae. It was first described by Alpheus Spring Packard in 1876 and is found in North America, with records from Texas and Montana.

Adults are very similar to Eupithecia indistincta, but the forewings have grayer ground color, a smaller discal dot and possess numerous, rather indistinct oblique crosslines. Adults have been recorded on wing in June and July.

The larvae feed within the seed capsules of Schoenocaulon texanum.

References

Moths described in 1876
zygadeniata
Moths of North America